Tiruchendur State Assembly constituency is one of the 234 state legislative assembly constituencies in Tamil Nadu in southern India. It is also one of the 6 state legislative assembly constituencies included in the Thoothukkudi Lok Sabha constituency. It is one of the oldest assembly segments in Tamil Nadu since Independence.

Madras State

Tamil Nadu

Election Results

2021

2016

2011

2009 By-election

2006

2001

1996

1991

1989

1984

1980

1977

1971

1967

1962

1957

1952

References 

 

Assembly constituencies of Tamil Nadu
Thoothukudi district